David Kreiner (born 8 March 1981 in Kitzbühel) is an Austrian Nordic combined skier who has competed since 1998. At the 2010 Winter Olympics, he won gold in the 4 x 5 team event.

Kreiner also won two medals in the 4 x 5 km team event at the FIS Nordic World Ski Championships with one silver (2001) and one bronze (2005). His best individual finish was ninth twice (7.5 km sprint: 2007, 15 km individual: 2001).

He has five individual career victories from 2001 to 2007.

References

Official website 

1981 births
Austrian male Nordic combined skiers
Living people
Nordic combined Grand Prix winners
Nordic combined skiers at the 2010 Winter Olympics
Olympic Nordic combined skiers of Austria
Olympic gold medalists for Austria
People from Kitzbühel
Sportspeople from Tyrol (state)
Olympic medalists in Nordic combined
FIS Nordic World Ski Championships medalists in Nordic combined
Medalists at the 2010 Winter Olympics